Chinyere Adah "Chi-chi" Nwanoku  (born June 1956) is a British double bassist and professor of Historical Double Bass Studies at the Royal Academy of Music. Nwanoku was a founder member and principal bassist of the Orchestra of the Age of Enlightenment, a position she held for 30 years.

Of Nigerian and Irish descent, she is the founder and Artistic Director of the Chineke! Orchestra, the first professional orchestra & junior orchestra in Europe to be made up of a majority of Black, Asian and ethnically diverse musicians.

Early life 
Nwanoku is of Nigerian and Irish descent and is the oldest of the five children of her parents, Dr Michael Nwanoku and his wife Margaret (née Hevey). Nwanoku's mother, Margaret, was disowned by her parents due to having an interracial relationship, however Margaret's mother secretly travelled to London three months after the birth of Nwanoku. Nwanoku was born in Fulham, London, and before reaching school age she lived in Imo State, Nigeria, where her family went for two years. Nwanoku attended Kendrick Girls' Grammar School in Reading, Berkshire. At the age of seven she began her education as a classical musician, first piano, and at the age of 18 bass. Nwanoku subsequently studied at the Royal Academy of Music while undertaking training as a 100-metre sprinter but had to end her athletic career following a knee injury.

Career 
Nwanoku is the founder of the Chineke! Orchestra, Europe's first classical orchestra made up of a majority of black and minority ethnic musicians, with whom she regularly performs. The orchestra, made up of 62 musicians representing 31 different nationalities, first performed in 2015 at the Queen Elizabeth Hall and in addition to her work with the Chineke! Orchestra, Nwanoku has worked as principal double bass of the ensemble Endymion, the London Mozart Players, the Academy of St Martin in the Fields, the English Baroque Soloists, the London Classical Players and the Orchestre Revolutionnaire et Romantique.

Besides playing and teaching bass, she has been active as a broadcaster, as in BBC Radio 3 Requests and in BBC TV Proms and as a member of BBC's Classical Star jury. In 2015 Nwanoku presented the BBC Radio 4 programmes In Search of the Black Mozart, featuring the lives and careers of black classical composers and performers from the 18th century, including Joseph Bologne, Chevalier de Saint-Georges; Ignatius Sancho; and George Bridgetower. Other positions held by Nwanoku include being a board member of the National Youth Orchestra, Tertis Foundation, London Music Fund, Royal Philharmonic Society (Council), was previously on Association of British Orchestras board, is Patron of Music Preserved, the Cherubim Trust.

Nwanoku was a guest of BBC Radio 4's Desert Island Discs on 11 February 2018. In 2019, Nwanoku opened the new site of Hackney New Primary School, a specialist music school for children.

She presented a 6-part radio show on Classic FM in October 2020 called Chi-chi's Classical Champions, a programme highlighting the music of contemporary and historical composers of Black, Asian and ethnically diverse heritage.  A second series was broadcast in 2021.

Nwanoku is based in London and has two children.

Honours, awards and recognition 
Nwanoku was appointed Member of the Order of the British Empire (MBE) in the 2001 Birthday Honours for services to music, Officer of the Order of the British Empire (OBE) in the 2017 Birthday Honours for services to music and Commander of the Order of the British Empire (CBE) in the 2022 Birthday Honours for services to music and diversity. In addition, she has been made an Honorary Fellow of both the Royal Academy of Music and Trinity Laban Conservatoire of Music.

In 2018 the BBC Woman's Hour placed Nwanoku ninth in a list of the world's most powerful women in music  and she has also been listed in the 2019, 2020, 2021, 2022 and 2023 Powerlist of the most influential Black Britons of the year.

References

External links
 Chineke! Foundation official website
 "Musician Chi-chi Nwanoku discussing her life and work on Talking Africa". YouTube video 12 May 2015.
 Chi-chi Nwanoku profile page at The Guardian

Classical double-bassists
Living people
Commanders of the Order of the British Empire
1956 births
Black British classical musicians
English people of Nigerian descent
English people of Irish descent
English double-bassists
English classical double-bassists
21st-century double-bassists
20th-century double-bassists
21st-century classical musicians
20th-century classical musicians
21st-century English musicians
20th-century English musicians
21st-century English women musicians
20th-century English women musicians
Women double-bassists
Alumni of the Royal Academy of Music
Academics of the Royal Academy of Music
People educated at Kendrick School
Musicians from London
People from Fulham